Musa Celik (born 11 April 1983) is a German professional footballer who plays for BV Osterfeld 1919 and is co-founder of the SK Gaming esports clan.

Career
Born in Oberhausen, Celik began his career in the 2006–07 season at Rot-Weiß Oberhausen, playing for the reserve team initially. In his next season, Musa played in 10 games and helped promote RWO to the 2. Bundesliga. He moved in June 2009 to Giresunspor. After a half year at Giresunspor he returned on 29 December 2009 to sign for his youth club Rot-Weiß Oberhausen where he played for the reserve in the Landesliga.

Celik appeared on the bench for Oberhausen's first match of the 2010–11 2. Bundesliga season against Hertha BSC.

On 14 April 2017, it was confirmed that Celik would join SV Genc Osman for the upcoming season as an assistant coach, but would also be registered to play games for the team. Later in the same year, he was promoted to head coach. He resigned on 26 May 2019.

Beside his job as a school teacher, he joined BV Osterfeld 1919 in the winter 2020.

Esports career
Celik is also notable as an esports pioneer. In 1997, he was one of the first players of the SK Gaming esports clan (named "Schroet Kommando" back then), founded by his close friends and brothers Ralf Reichert, Tim Reichert and Benjamin Reichert. Among gamers, Celik was known as SK|kila.

References

External links
 

Living people
1983 births
German footballers
Association football forwards
Rot-Weiß Oberhausen players
Giresunspor footballers
KFC Uerdingen 05 players
2. Bundesliga players
German esports players
German people of Turkish descent
SK Gaming players